Compass College (Modern Continuing Education Centre) is a tertiary institution providing career oriented hospitality & tourism management and business management programmes in Hong Kong. Compass College is an education organisation affiliated with the Modern Education. It provides one-year diploma programme and two-years higher diploma programme for secondary school graduates.

Courses
Compass College provides one programme accredited by HKCAVVQ, cooperating with Business and Technician Education Council (BTEC) in level 3 and level 5 diploma programmes, AH&LA certificate courses, and NCC Education higher diploma programme.

One-year Diploma Programme
 Diploma in International Hospitality Management 
 International Diploma in Hospitality Management
 Professional Diploma in Hospitality & Tourism Management

Two-years Diploma Programme
Executive Diploma in Accounting & Management

Higher National Diploma BTEC Diploma Programme 

 Pearson BTEC Level 3 Certificate in Hospitality
 Pearson BTEC Level 3 Certificate in Business
 Pearson BTEC Level 5 HNC Diploma in Hospitality Management
 Pearson BTEC Level 5 HNC Diploma in Business

American Hotel and Lodging Association certificate courses
 Certified Guest Service Professional

NCC Education Programme

 NCC Education Level 4 Diploma in Business (QCF)
 NCC Education Level 5 Diploma in Business (QCF)

IELTS Registration Centre
Compass College is one of the registration centre of IELTS from British Council. Students can also have study aboard consultation and work abroad consultation from Compass College.

References

External links
 

Universities and colleges in Hong Kong
Schools in Hong Kong
Vocational education in Hong Kong
Education in Hong Kong